Richard Strebinger (born 14 February 1993) is an Austrian professional footballer who most recently played as a goalkeeper for Legia Warsaw.

Club career
Strebinger played for the youth teams of SC Piesting, FV Club 83 Wiener Neustadt, and AKA St. Pölten before moving to Germany and joining Hertha BSC. He played 26 matches for Hertha's second team, but did not make it to the first squad. In summer 2012, he moved to SV Werder Bremen. In Bremen, he also played for the second team but made his professional debut for the first team on 7 December 2014 when their regular goalkeeper Raphael Wolf was injured and Strebinger was substituted in. In order to get match time, he was loaned out in January 2015 to SSV Jahn Regensburg until the end of the season.

On 20 February 2022, he penned a short-term contract with an extension option with reigning champions of Polish Ekstraklasa Legia Warsaw, who, at the time of Strebinger's signing, were second last in the league table. On 11 June 2022, Strebinger left the club.

International career
Strebinger played for the Austria U17, U18 and U19, and U21. He made his debut for the Austria national team on 16 October 2018 in a friendly against Denmark.

Career statistics

Club

References

External links
 
  
 

1993 births
Living people
Austrian footballers
Association football goalkeepers
Austria youth international footballers
Austria under-21 international footballers
Austria international footballers
Hertha BSC II players
SV Werder Bremen players
SV Werder Bremen II players
SSV Jahn Regensburg players
SK Rapid Wien players
Legia Warsaw players
Legia Warsaw II players
Bundesliga players
3. Liga players
Ekstraklasa players
III liga players
Sportspeople from Wiener Neustadt
Footballers from Lower Austria
Austrian expatriate footballers
Austrian expatriate sportspeople in Germany
Expatriate footballers in Germany
Austrian expatriate sportspeople in Poland
Expatriate footballers in Poland